Hediberto "Eddie" Vargas Rodriguez (born February 23, 1959) is a retired Major League Baseball first baseman. He played during two seasons at the major league level for the Pittsburgh Pirates.

See also
 List of Major League Baseball players from Puerto Rico

References
"Eddie Vargas Statistics". The Baseball Cube. 10 January 2008.
"Hediberto Vargas Statistics". The Baseball Cube. 10 January 2008.

"Eddie Vargas Statistics". Baseball-Reference. 10 January 2008.

1959 births
Living people
People from Guánica, Puerto Rico
Pittsburgh Pirates players
Major League Baseball first basemen
Major League Baseball players from Puerto Rico
Lynn Pirates (1983) players
Nashville Sounds players
Hawaii Islanders players